King Rat is a 1965 American war film written and directed by Bryan Forbes and starring George Segal and James Fox. They play Corporal King and Flight Lieutenant Marlowe, respectively, two World War II prisoners of war in a squalid camp in Singapore. Among the supporting cast are John Mills and Tom Courtenay. The film was adapted from James Clavell's novel King Rat (1962), which in turn is partly based on Clavell's experiences as a POW at Changi Prison in Singapore in the latter part of the Second World War.

Plot
Corporal King is an anomaly in the Japanese prison camp. One of only a handful of Americans amongst the British and Australian inmates, he thrives through his conniving and black market enterprises, while others, nearly all of higher rank, struggle to survive sickness and starvation while trying to retain their civilized standards. King recruits upper class British RAF officer Flight Lieutenant Peter Marlowe to act as a translator. As they become acquainted, Marlowe comes to like the man and appreciate his cunning. King respects Marlowe, but his attitude is otherwise ambiguous; when Marlowe is injured, King obtains expensive medicines to save Marlowe's gangrenous arm from amputation, but, despite the fact he stays by the sick man's bedside, it is unclear whether he does so out of friendship or because Marlowe is the only one who knows where the proceeds from King's latest and most profitable venture are hidden.

However, lower class, seemingly incorruptible British Provost, First Lieutenant Grey has only contempt for the American and does his best to bring him down. Then Grey has to deal with an unrelated dilemma when he accidentally discovers that the high-ranking officer in charge of the meagre food rations has been stealing. He rejects a bribe and zealously takes the matter to Colonel George Smedley-Taylor. To his dismay, Smedley-Taylor tells him the corrupt officer and his assistant have merely been relieved of their duties and orders him to forget all about it. Grey accuses Smedley-Taylor of being in on the scheme, but the tampered weight he presented to the colonel as evidence has been replaced, so he no longer has proof of the crime. Smedley-Taylor offers to promote him to acting captain. When a troubled Grey does not respond, Smedley-Taylor takes his silence as consent.

King starts breeding rats and selling the meat to British officers, telling them it is mouse-deer. When a pet dog is put down for killing a chicken, King has it cooked, and he and his friends secretly eat it. Although King's friends protest when they discover the origin of the meat, they ultimately relish it. The stakes are raised when they get a diamond to sell.

Then the Japanese commander reads a scroll while a junior officer translates for the senior British officers, informing them that the Japanese have surrendered and the war is over. The prisoners celebrate – all except King. He realizes he is no longer the unquestioned, if unofficial, ruler of the camp.

Weaver, a lone British paratrooper appears from seemingly nowhere, walks up to the prison gates and fires a revolver in the air. The guards surrender. King manages to squelch a premature attempt by resentful underling First Sergeant Max to reassert his rank and authority, but that only delays the inevitable. When Marlowe speaks to him before King's departure from the camp, King belittles their friendship, saying "you worked for me, and I paid you". The Americans are put on a truck. Marlowe rushes to say goodbye to King, but is too late, and the truck drives off. Grey remarks that it was, "our lot (the British working class) that threw Churchill out." "We'll be running things from now on," indicating that the end of the war presages the beginning of a new political order.

Cast

Richard Dawson appears near the end of the film as Captain Weaver, a paratrooper who is sent ahead to claim the prison from the Japanese, as the war has ended. An American sergeant (Mickey Simpson) rounds up the Americans to send them home.

Awards
Burnett Guffey was nominated for Academy Awards for Cinematography, and Robert Emmet Smith and Frank Tuttle for Art Direction.

Reception
The film has been praised for its realism and cinematography. Moreover, Segal's performance has been cited as one of the strongest of his career. However, Clavell later said "my feeling is the film failed because Forbes took away the story thread and made it a composite of character studies".

Inaccuracy
George Segal's character, U.S. Army Corporal King, wears the shoulder patch of the American 34th Infantry Division. That division fought in North Africa and Italy, not in the Asian or Pacific areas of operation. However, the patch might have been used (either accidentally or intentionally) because of its resemblance to the patch of the Philippine Division, in which King could have possibly served.

See also
 List of American films of 1965

References

External links
 
 
 
 
 King Rat at Rotten Tomatoes

1965 films
1965 war films
American war films
American black-and-white films
Columbia Pictures films
Films scored by John Barry (composer)
Films based on Australian novels
Films based on works by James Clavell
Films directed by Bryan Forbes
Films set in Singapore
Pacific War films
World War II prisoner of war films
Asian Saga
1960s English-language films
1960s American films